Rosenberger is a Germanic-language family name derived from a toponym Rosenberg + the ending er, with the principal meaning "one from Rose Mountain". However, as a toponym Rosenberg (Rose Mountain), may have originally meant "death mountain" or simply "red hill", from rot + berg.  

Today there are many people around the world whose central European ancestors adopted the surname, including many Germans. It is, additionally, used by many Ashkenazi Jews.

People
 Adolf Rosenberger (1900–1967), German businessman and race car driver
 Carol Rosenberger (born 1933), classical pianist
 Cliff Rosenberger (born 1981), member of the Ohio House of Representatives
 Ian Rosenberger (born 1981), contestant on the American television series Survivor: Palau
 Ferdinand Rosenberger (1845–1899), German historian of physics
 Iris Rosenberger (born 1985), German-Turkish female swimmer
 James Rosenberger (1887–1946), U.S. Olympic athlete, 1912 Summer Olympics
 Jasmin Rosenberger (born 1985), German-Turkish female swimmer 
 John Francis Rosenberger (1918–1977), American comic book artist
 Joseph Rosenberger (died 1996), founder of the first shatnes laboratory in America
 Joseph R. Rosenberger (1925–1993), author of nearly one hundred action-adventure books, including the Death Merchant series
 Katharina Rosenberger, Swiss composer and sound artist
 Martina Rosenberger, specialist in the waldzither
 Otto August Rosenberger (1800–1890), German astronomer
 Waldemar Rosenberger (1848–1918), Russian director of the Volapük Academy
Johann Andreas Rosenberger (1847-1915), German surgeon

Other uses
 Rosenberger (crater), lunar impact crater
 Rosenberger Building, a historic commercial building in Colfax, Indiana
 Rosenberger v. University of Virginia, Supreme Court of the United States case
 Rosenberger Hochfrequenztechnik, a German manufacturer high-frequency coaxial connectors

See also
 Rosenberg (disambiguation)

German-language surnames
Jewish surnames
Yiddish-language surnames

de:Rosenberger